Elena Arenas (born August 31, 2001) is an American artistic gymnast. She qualified to Junior International Elite in 2014 and competed during the 2014 and 2015 Elite seasons. She is currently a freshman being part of the Louisiana State University women's gymnastics team.

Gymnastics career 
Arenas trains at Georgia Elite Gymnastics in Watkinsville, Georgia.  She is coached primarily by her father, Pete. In 2015, Arenas won the WOGA Classic.

Personal life 
Arenas' parents are Pete and Kim Arenas (née Arnold).  Her mother, Kim, was also an elite gymnast and won two consecutive NCAA All-Around national championships. Elena's sister, Isabel, was a Level 10 gymnast.

The family lives in Bishop, Georgia and Arenas was homeschooled and graduated in 2020.

References

External links
 USA Gymnastics profile

2001 births
People from Milledgeville, Georgia
American female artistic gymnasts
Living people
21st-century American women
LSU Tigers women's gymnasts